Bobby Joe Pierce is an American politician who served as a member of the Arkansas Senate for the 27th district from 2013 to 2017. Pierce served consecutively in the Arkansas General Assembly from January 2007 until January 2013 in the Arkansas House of Representatives district 19 seat.

Elections
2012 With Senate District 27 Senator Mike Fletcher redistricted to District 13, Pierce faced fellow Representative Garry Smith in the May 22, 2012 Democratic Primary, winning with 3,648 votes (52.1%), and won the November 6, 2012 General election with 15,805 votes (50.5%) against Republican nominee Henry Frisby.
2006 Initially in House District 19, when Representative Bob Adams left the Legislature and left the seat open, Pierce was unopposed for the 2006 Democratic Primary and won the November 7, 2006 General election against Republican nominee David Workman.
2008 Pierce was unopposed for both the May 20, 2008 Democratic Primary and the November 4, 2008 General election.
2010 Pierce was unopposed for both the May 18, 2010 Democratic Primary and the November 2, 2010 General election.

References

External links
Official page at the Arkansas General Assembly

Bobby Pierce at Ballotpedia
Bobby J. Pierce at the National Institute on Money in State Politics

Place of birth missing (living people)
Year of birth missing (living people)
Living people
Democratic Party Arkansas state senators
Democratic Party members of the Arkansas House of Representatives
People from Grant County, Arkansas
21st-century American politicians